John Charles Baron (born 21 June 1959) is a British politician who has served as the Member of Parliament (MP) for Basildon and Billericay, previously Billericay, since 2001. A member of the Conservative Party, he has rebelled against his party relatively frequently, specifically in his calling for a referendum on the European Union (EU) before the 2015 election and in opposing military intervention in Iraq, Libya and Syria.

Baron is a strong critic of the EU; he was a vocal supporter of Brexit during the 2016 EU referendum. He is now a supporter of the pro-Brexit Leave Means Leave campaign.

Early life
Baron was born in Redhill, Surrey and educated at Queen's College, Taunton, Jesus College, Cambridge and at the Royal Military Academy Sandhurst.

Career

Military service
After university, Baron was commissioned into the Royal Regiment of Fusiliers on 3 January 1984 as a second lieutenant (on probation). His commission was confirmed and he was promoted to lieutenant with seniority from 8 August 1984. He was promoted to captain on 8 February 1987. He served in Northern Ireland, Cyprus and Germany.

On 3 January 1988, he transferred to the Regular Army Reserve of Officers. This signalled the end of his military career, but he remained liable to call up. He resigned his commission on 1 June 1997.

Banking career
In 1987, he became a merchant banker: working as a fund manager then director of Henderson Private Investors Ltd (later Henderson Global Investors) and Rothschild Asset Management.

Political career
In 1995, Baron became the treasurer of the Streatham Conservative Association. In 1997 David Amess decided not to risk standing again in his ultra-marginal Conservative seat of Basildon and was elected for the safer seat of Southend West. Baron won the Conservative nomination to defend Basildon at the 1997 general election, but Angela Smith won it as a Labour Party candidate with a strong majority.

In November 1999, Teresa Gorman (C) announced intention to stand down at the next general election from her seat Billericay, neighbouring Basildon. Baron was selected to defend Billericay at the 2001 general election and he held the seat with a majority of more than 5,000, which he doubled at the 2005 general election. He made his maiden speech on 20 July 2001.

Baron was a member of Iain Duncan Smith's frontbench team, but resigned in March 2003 in protest at Duncan Smith's support of the Iraq War. He was re-appointed by Duncan Smith as a health spokesman four months later, a position he held until July 2007 when he was moved to the Conservative Whip's Office.

Baron was a strong backer of David Davis in the 2005 Conservative leadership election, having also supported him in the 2001 leadership contest won by Iain Duncan Smith.

Baron was the only Conservative among just 15 MPs who voted against British participation in the attack on Libya in the Commons on 21 March 2011. In 2013 he tabled a backbench motion to mandate a vote in Parliament before providing "lethal support" to anti-government forces in Syria, which ultimately prevented further military intervention when the government was unable to secure the necessary parliamentary support and he was also part of a minority voting against the government on air strikes against Islamic State of Iraq and the Levant.

In June 2012, Baron delivered a letter, signed by over 100 Tory MPs, to the Prime Minister David Cameron urging him "to place on the Statute Book before the next General Election a commitment to hold a referendum during the next Parliament on the nature of our relationship with the European Union". In May 2013 he tabled a rebel amendment to the Queen's Speech to "express regret" that a referendum on the EU could not be held sooner, which was backed by over 100 MPs.

His reputation as a Eurosceptic and "serial rebel" saw his name mentioned as a possible defector to the UK Independence Party. Speaking to the BBC's Newsnight in response to speculation in late 2014, Baron said: "You should never say never in politics, but the bottom line is my very strong preference is to stay within the Conservative party."

In July 2014, Mark d'Arcy of the BBC named Baron his choice in "Parliamentarians of the Year" for 2013/14 for his role in opposing military action in Syria and seeking a promise of a referendum on membership of the European Union, writing that "he is not a household name or a fiery orator, but his fingerprints are all over the two most significant parliamentary events of the last 12 months." He voted against further airstrikes in 2015.

Following the publication of the Sue Gray Report, Baron withdrew support for prime minister Boris Johnson calling for his resignation stating, “I'm afraid the Prime Minister no longer enjoys my support”.

Personal life
Baron is married and has two daughters.

References

External links
 John Baron MP official website

Conservative Party (UK) MPs for English constituencies
UK MPs 2001–2005
UK MPs 2005–2010
Royal Regiment of Fusiliers officers
Alumni of Jesus College, Cambridge
1959 births
Living people
People educated at Queen's College, Taunton
UK MPs 2010–2015
Politics of the Borough of Basildon
UK MPs 2015–2017
UK MPs 2017–2019
UK MPs 2019–present
British Eurosceptics